The Sirus Cup, formerly International Mixed Doubles Sochi is an annual mixed doubles curling tournament on the ISS Mixed Doubles World Curling Tour. It is held annually in the late February/early March at the training centre of the Iceberg Skating Palace in Sochi, Russia. Prior to 2020, the event was held twice a year, with an event held in November as well.

The purse for the event is US$5,000. and its event categorization is 300 (highest calibre is 1000).

The event has been held since 2017.

Past champions

References

World Curling Tour events
International curling competitions hosted by Russia
Sports competitions in Sochi
Mixed doubles curling